Travis Wilson may refer to:
Travis Wilson (wide receiver) (born 1984), American football wide receiver
Travis Wilson (American football, born 1993), American football quarterback and tight end
Travis Wilson (softball) (born 1977), New Zealand softball and baseball player